Lucy McVitty Weber (born August 5, 1952) is a Democratic member of the New Hampshire House of Representatives, representing the Cheshire 1st District since 2006.

Weber went to the Vermont Law School and practices law in Vermont.

References

External links
New Hampshire House of Representatives - Lucy Weber official New Hampshire House website
Project Vote Smart - Representative Lucy Weber profile (New Hampshire)
Follow the Money - Lucy Weber
2006 campaign contributions

1952 births
21st-century American politicians
21st-century American women politicians
Living people
Democratic Party members of the New Hampshire House of Representatives
People from Walpole, New Hampshire
Politicians from New York City
Women state legislators in New Hampshire